Kentucky Route 97 (KY 97) is a  state highway in Graves County, Kentucky that runs from Tennessee State Route 69 (SR 69) and State Line Road West on the Kentucky-Tennessee state border southeast of Sedalia to KY 80, KY 121, and KY 121 Business just southeast of Mayfield.

Route description

KY 97 enters Kentucky on the Graves-Calloway County line and travels north for a few tenths of a mile before curving toward the northwest away from the Calloway County line. It continues to the northwest through rural sections of southeastern Graves County, passing through the unincorporated community of Bell City. Nearly  from the Tennessee state line, KY 97 forms a junction with KY 94 and continues toward the northwest passing through Sedalia and forming a junction with KY 339/KY 381. The route remains two lanes for its entirety and passes through mostly rural sections of Graves County.

History

By 1937, KY 97 was a mostly unpaved road that terminated in the center of Mayfield.  By 1989, KY 97 ended at its current northern terminus at a junction with KY 121 just south of Mayfield.

Major intersections

References

0097
Transportation in Graves County, Kentucky